Full Moon is the debut EP by South Korean singer Sunmi. It was released by JYP Entertainment on February 17, 2014.

Background and release
In August 2013, it was announced that Sunmi would return to her musical career as a solo artist under JYP Entertainment and Park Jin-young himself would take over her complete production, including dance, MV, outfits, and the song. On August 11, Sunmi was announced to making her solo debut with single 24 Hours. The music video for the song was released on August 20, 2013, followed by its debut television performance on August 22, on M! Countdown. The digital single was released on August 26. "24 Hours" reached number 2 on the weekly Gaon Digital Charts and number 3 on Billboard's Korea K-Pop Hot 100 chart.

On January 31, Sunmi was announced will be making comeback with releasing her first extended play in February. Sunmi has scheduled making her comeback on February 17. On February 6, Sunmi revealed her first extended play Full Moon. On February 10, the album's tracklist was released, revealing that Wonder Girls' Yubin, GOT7's Jackson and JYP trainee Lena Park will featured on one of the tracks. The album also includes her debut single 24 Hours. "Full Moon" featuring Lena Park was released on February 17, along with the album and music video.  The song reached number 2 on the weekly Gaon Digital Charts and number 3 on Billboard's Korea K-pop Hot 100.

Track listing

Charts

Sales

Release history

References

External links
 
 

2014 debut EPs
JYP Entertainment EPs
Genie Music EPs
Korean-language EPs
Sunmi EPs